Mario Belgrano (April 7, 1884 in Paris – 1947 in Buenos Aires) was an Argentine historian.

His parents were Juan Carlos Belgrano Martínez and Gregoria Flora "Florita" Vega Belgrano y Belgrano, and his brothers were Manuel Belgrano Vega, Néstor Belgrano Vega and Mario Belgrano Vega. He got married with Blanca Cigorraga Pondal on May 15, 1919, and his sons were Mario Carlos Belgrano Cigorraga, Miguel Manuel Belgrano Cigorraga and Blanca Flora Belgrano Cigorraga.

He wrote books about the 19th century general Manuel Belgrano. He worked at the National Academy of History of Argentina and the Belgranian National Institute.

Works
 Belgrano - 1927
 La Francia y la monarquía en el Plata (1818-1920) - 1933
 Rivadavia y sus gestiones diplomaticas con España (1815-1820) - 1933
 Contribuciones para el estudio de la historia de América - 1941
 El nuevo estado del Portugal
 Manuel Belgrano: los ideales de la patria
 La política externa con los Estados de Europa (1813-1816)
 Biografía del general Juan O'Brien : 1786-1861 : guerrero de la independencia - 1938
 Historia de Belgrano - 1944

Argentine biographers
20th-century Argentine historians
Argentine male writers
1884 births
1947 deaths
Male non-fiction writers
Argentine expatriates in France